Tetsuya Shiokawa (塩川鉄也 Shiokawa Tetsuya) is a Japanese politician and member of the House of Representatives for the Japanese Communist Party. He is against the consumption tax, saying that it is unfair for small businesses.

References

1961 births
Japanese Communist Party politicians
Living people
Members of the House of Representatives (Japan)
Place of birth missing (living people)
21st-century Japanese politicians